Kattalagar Koil is a temple located in southern hills (meru malai) of Tamil Nadu, India, about 17 km from Srivilliputhur (birthplace of Andal).

The temple is at a hill top. There is a spring in the temple; it is a wonder to see a spring in the hill top, since water flows only downwards. None of them know from where the water is flowing. And the water speed is equivalent throughout the year. The spring has crystal clear water throughout the year. Behind the temple, there are two mountain ranges visible. One of them resembles the face of Perumal (Lord Vishnu) and other one resembles a frog.

Kattalagar is Kallalagar of madurai came to Srivilliputhur to marry Sri Andal. But before his arrival, SriAndal married Sri Renga Mannar and Kattalagar stayed there in the forest.

We have to walk around 6 km to reach the temple. The forest itself is made a sanctuary for Grizzled Giant Squirrel. There is a water-fall on the way to the temple. Water will be available in the streams along the way. Wild animals like elephants, bison and giant squirrels can sometimes be spotted. Temple is kept open every Saturday and Sunday from 9 AM to 4 PM.

External links 
 Kattalagar Koil  Wikimapia

Hindu temples in Virudhunagar district
Vishnu temples